New Zealand at the 1950 British Empire Games was represented by a team of 175 competitors and 24 officials. Selection of the host nation's team for the Games in Auckland, was the responsibility of the New Zealand Olympic and British Empire Games Association. New Zealand's flagbearer at the opening ceremony was Harold Nelson.  The New Zealand team finished third on the medal table, winning a total of 53 medals, 10 of which were gold.

New Zealand has competed in every games, starting with the British Empire Games in 1930 at Hamilton, Ontario.

Medal tables
New Zealand was third in the medal table in 1950, with a total of 53 medals, including 10 gold.

Competitors
The following table lists the number of New Zealand competitors participating at the Games according to gender and sport.

Athletics

Men

Track and road

Field

Women

Track

Field

Boxing

Cycling

Road
Men's road race

Track
Men's 1000 m sprint

Men's 1 km time trial

;Men's 4000 m individual pursuit

Men's 10 miles track race

Diving

Fencing

Men

Individual épée

Individual foil

Individual sabre

Team épée

Team foil

Team sabre

Women

Individual foil

Lawn bowls

Rowing

Swimming

Men

Women

Water polo

Team roster
Charles Brown, Jim Cameron, Terry Harris, Bob Hatchwell, Barrie Hutchinson, Tom Logan (c), Edward Raven, Jim Walsh, Neil Williams, Wally Williams

Game 1

Game 2

Game 3

Final standings

Weightlifting

Wrestling

Officials
 Team manager – Bill Holley
 Athletics
 Manager – Jim Barnes
 Chaperone – Pearl Ellis
 Coach – Frank Sharpley
 Masseurs – J. Meek, W. N. Connell
 Boxing
 Manager – K. A. Neale
 Trainer – Richard Dunn
 Masseur – A. G. Bates
 Cycling manager – Cliff Chainey
 Fencing manager – T. H. Wilson
 Lawn bowls manager – J. R. Smith
 Rowing masseur – C. G. Fearon
 Swimming
 Manager – Len Moorhouse
 Chaperone – Winifred Bridson
 Coach – D. F. Watson
 Weightlifting manager / coach – C. S. McDonald
 Wrestling
 Manager – J. W. Steele
 Coach / assistant manager – Vic Rawle

See also
New Zealand Olympic Committee
New Zealand at the Commonwealth Games
New Zealand at the 1948 Summer Olympics
New Zealand at the 1952 Summer Olympics

Notes

References
The Story of the British Empire Games, Auckland, New Zealand, 1950 (1950, official history by the Organising Committee)
The Commonwealth Games: The First 60 Years 1930–1990 by Cleve Dheensaw (1994, Hodder & Stoughton, Canada/New Zealand)

External links
NZOC website on the 1950 games
Commonwealth Games Federation website
Athletes in the 1966 Encyclopaedia of New Zealand has a paragraph on these Games

1950
British Empire Games
Sport in Auckland
Nations at the 1950 British Empire Games